Ovacık District is a district of Tunceli Province in Turkey. The town of Ovacık is its seat and the district had a population of 6,366 in 2021.

Composition 
Beside the town of Ovacık, the district encompasses sixty-two villages and 169 hamlets.

Adaköy
Ağaçpınar
Aktaş
Akyayık
Arslandoğmuş
Aşağıtorunoba
Aşlıca
Bilgeç
Burnak
Buzlutepe
Büyükköy
Cevizlidere
Çakmaklı
Çambulak
Çatköy
Çayüstü
Çemberlitaş
Çöğürlük
Doludibek
Eğimli
Eğrikavak
Eğripınar
Elgazi
Eskigedik
Garipuşağı
Gözeler
Güneykonak
Halitpınar
Hanuşağı
Havuzlu
Isıtma
Işıkvuran
Karaoğlan
Karataş
Karayonca
Kızık
Konaklar
Koyungölü
Kozluca
Köseler
Kuşluca
Mollaaliler
Otlubahçe
Öveçler
Paşadüzü
Sarıtosun
Söğütlü
Şahverdi
Tatuşağı
Tepsili
Topuzlu
Yakatarla
Yalmanlar
Yarımkaya
Yaylagünü
Yazıören
Yenikonak
Yenisöğüt
Yeşilyazı
Yoğunçam
Yoncalı
Ziyaret

References 

Districts of Tunceli Province
Ovacık District